The Segunda División de Nicaragua is the second football level of Nicaraguan football.

It is organized by FENIFUT.

Format 
Torneo de Apertura (Opening tournament) and Torneo de Clausura (Closure Tournament). The Apertura champion each year will play the champion of the respective Clausura tournament, in order to determine who will ascend to the Primera Division, or if occasion arises, the team that manages to win two tournaments in a year, amount direct without having to play a game round. while the loser or the team with the best position on the table will face the 9th placed team in the primera division in a playoff to determine who will be promoted.

2016–17 teams

Champions
 ART Municipal Jalapa 2012 Apertura  
 ART Municipal Jalapa 2013 Clausura
 UNAN Managua 2013 Apertura
 Real Esteli F.C. B 2014 Clausura
 Chinandega FC 2014 Apertura

External links
 http://www.futbolnica.net/i.php?i=arranca-liga-de-ascenso-el-xilotepelt-no-va#futbolnica

2
Nicaragua